Boss Nigger (also known as Boss and The Black Bounty Killer) is a 1975 blaxploitation Western film directed by Jack Arnold, and stars former football player Fred Williamson, who both wrote and co-produced. Boss Nigger is the first film for which Williamson was credited as screenwriter or producer.

Plot
Upon finding a wagon under attack by bandits, two black bounty hunters, Boss and Amos (Fred Williamson and D'Urville Martin, respectively) intervene and save Clara Mae, a black woman (Carmen Hayworth). Upon inspecting the bodies, the bounty hunters find several have rewards to their name and one holds a letter from the mayor of the nearby town San Miguel inviting him to become sheriff on the recommendation of fugitive Jed Clayton (William Smith). The pair take Clara Mae to safety in San Miguel and meet Mayor Griffin (R. G. Armstrong). Knowing that there is no sheriff and holding proof that the mayor intended to give it to a gang member, Boss is able to outsmart the mayor and intimidate other members of the town council into giving him the position. As sheriff, Boss and Amos keep the peace and enforce several "Black Laws" such as issuing fines or periods in jail for calling either of them a "nigger" in public. In his duties Boss meets Miss Pruit (Barbara Leigh), a white schoolteacher, who initially offends Boss by talking of the fond memories she has of her family's black slaves, but earns his forgiveness and develops a romantic interest in him. When a gang of Jed Clayton's men meet the mayor in the town saloon to extort supplies from the town (an arrangement that the mayor allows on the understanding that the gang will do no harm to the town or its citizens), Boss and Amos kill one gang member and arrest two more - with one prisoner being killed as he attempts to escape town assisted by the mayor.

Jed and his outlaws then attempt to help the imprisoned outlaw escape by blowing a hole in the prison wall using dynamite. During the resulting raid on the town Clara Mae is kidnapped and taken away by Jed's men, while a Mexican child named Poncho (whom Boss had befriended) is killed. Boss attempts to meet Jed and his gang at their hideout but is himself kidnapped, tied to a pole, and tortured. When Jed leaves at night to meet with the mayor, Amos is able to rescue an injured Boss with the help of Clara Mae, taking him to Miss Pruit's house to recover. Knowing that Jed and his men will be riding through town the next day on their supply run, the bounty hunters plan an ambush.

With the assistance of other residents such as the doctor and blacksmith of the town, Boss and Amos prepare by planting explosives around the town and take up firing positions out of sight. As the gang rides into town, they enter the cantina where Clara Mae is living. When she refuses Jed's advances, he murders her. They then move on to the town itself, while Boss and Amos launch their surprise attack. Boss follows Jed into the Saloon where they fight, and Boss finally kills Jed. As Boss steps outside, he is shot twice by Mayor Griffin, but manages to kill his attacker by throwing a knife into his chest. Now seriously wounded, Boss pleads with Amos to not let him "die in a white folks' town". Miss Pruit urges Boss to take her with him, though he declines. The movie concludes as Amos rides out of town with Boss towed on a wagon, his fate left ambiguous.

Critical analysis

Initial release
On its initial release, Vincent Canby of The New York Times described Boss Nigger as "a pleasant surprise if you stumble upon it without warning". Canby characterized Williamson's acting as "an immensely self-assured parody of the Man with No Name played by Clint Eastwood in Sergio Leone's films". Canby concluded his review by highlighting what made Boss Nigger notable among black Westerns: "Most black Westerns either ignore race or make it the fundamental point of the movie. Boss Nigger somehow manages to do both quite successfully."

Later critics
In its review of Boss Nigger, written in 2007, Time Out suggested that Williamson was parodying the violent roles he had played in other blaxploitation films. The review noted that Boss Nigger was notable for its "old-fashioned bloodless violence".

Writing in 2006, film critic Ryan Diduck described the marketing of Boss Nigger and other blaxploitation films to black audiences as an example of "empowerment through an overturned representation of long-established agency limitations for black men". Diduck specifically cited the trailer for Boss Nigger for the manner in which it elicits feelings of black superiority and white hysteria and encourages the audience to identify with the outsider hero who finds himself at odds with the rules of white America.

William Smith on Boss Nigger
In a 1998 interview, Smith spoke of his experience filming Boss Nigger. Smith, who is white, said that he never felt any racial tension, despite the fact that production took place during the height of the Black Power movement. He went on to describe the making of the film:

Release
Boss Nigger was released in some areas under the title The Boss or The Black Bounty Killer.

A DVD of Boss Nigger, simply titled Boss, was released in 2008. The blu ray was released in 2018.

See also
 List of American films of 1975

References

External links

Blaxploitation films
1975 Western (genre) films
American Western (genre) films
1975 films
Fictional African-American people
African-American Western (genre) films
Films directed by Jack Arnold
Films shot in Arizona
Dimension Pictures films
1970s English-language films
1970s American films